The abbreviation TCUL stands for

 Texas Credit Union League in the United States of America
 Transporte Colectivo Urbano de Luanda, the public transit company of Luanda, the capital of Angola
 Tap changing under load, see tap changer